This is a list of footballers who have played at least 1,000 official football matches at all age levels: regarding junior levels, only the matches with national teams are counted, because such data for club levels cannot be found for the majority of the players.

English goalkeeper Peter Shilton holds the record for the most appearances. In March 2022, Robert Carmona from Uruguay was recognized as the oldest active footballer by Guinness World Records and was reported as having played around 2,200 official matches, a total that would place him at the top of the list by far; however, due to a lack of details about the distribution of these matches per year and team, or even which teams he played for, he cannot be added to the list, at least for the time being.

The current active player with the most official appearances is Paul Bastock, who is second overall, as well as among goalkeepers.

Goalkeepers' careers tend to have a longer span and they play more matches on average, as they face fewer challenges in maintaining speed and stamina than outfield players. Cristiano Ronaldo holds the record among outfield players, is sixth overall, and is also the active outfield player with the most official appearances.

Ranking 

 

Bold indicates the player is currently active.
+ indicates that the actual number may be higher.
? indicates that the number is unknown.

Notes

Trivia 
 Peter Shilton holds the record for the most competitive appearances.
 Robert Carmona, who in March 2022 was reported to have been recognized as the currently oldest active footballer by Guinness World Records, has been reported as having played around 2,200 official matches, a number that would make him top the list by far, but, in lack of details about the number of matches per team and as it's unclear even which are the teams he played, he cannot be added to the list, at least for the time being.
 Cristiano Ronaldo holds the record among outfield players, and he is sixth overall.
 Paul Bastock, who is second on the list, holds the record in club appearances.
 Rogério Ceni has the highest number of appearances (1,214) in senior top-level football matches.
 Paolo Maldini has the highest number of appearances (1,028) in senior top-level football, having played with the lowest amount of teams.
 Neville Southall also made at least 1,000 official appearances, but hasn't been added to the list yet, because of missing statistical data in the years prior to Bury. 
 Romário also made at least 1,000 official appearances, if 4 matches with state selects, 2 with country selects and 2 with other selects (benefit matches) are included as official, which are by RSSSF.

See also 
 List of top international men's football goalscorers by country
 List of men's footballers with 100 or more international caps
 List of men's footballers with 50 or more international goals
 List of men's footballers with 500 or more goals
 List of goalscoring goalkeepers
 List of one-club men in football

References 

Bibliography
 *  
 *  
 *  
 *

External links 

Association football records and statistics
Most official appearances
Career achievements of association football players